Fandry is a 2013 Marathi-language film, written and directed by Nagraj Manjule in his directorial debut. It stars Somnath Avghade and Rajeshwari Kharat. The story focuses on a young boy's love amidst caste-based discrimination. The film, set in Akolner, a village near Ahmednagar, revolves around the issue of caste discrimination and narrates the story of a teenager from a Dalit family who lives at the village fringe, and falls in love with an upper caste girl.

The film won the Grand Jury Prize at the Mumbai International Film Festival. The film was released theatrically on Valentine's Day 14 February 2014. This film received critical acclaim. At the 61st National Film Awards, it won the Indira Gandhi Award for Best Debut Film of a Director.

Plot

Fandry is a fictional story set in the background of caste discrimination depicting the love of a 13-year-old boy.

Jambhuvant Kachru Mane, nicknamed Jabya (Somnath Awghade), is a pre-teen who lives in a makeshift house on the outskirts of a caste segregated village with his parents and 2 sisters (one a widow with a toddler). The family belongs to the Kaikadi community, an oppressed caste, and earns its living by doing menial jobs. Owing to the caste-ridden power structure of the village society, the boy's father has a fearful and submissive personality which is exploited by upper-caste villagers.

Jabya is disillusioned by the predicament of his family and shows interest in school where he has also fallen in one-sided love with a forward caste girl named Shalini (nickname: Shalu) (Rajeshwari Kharat) who he has never talked to but tries desperately to get her to notice him.

The plot opens with Jabya and his school friend Pirya (Suraj Pawar) armed with a slingshot trying to catch a bird (the Black Sparrow) in the wilderness. However, the bird call that punctuates the film is that of the Red Wattled Lapwing (Titawi), which is supposed to bring bad luck. The black sparrow, with its distinctive forked tail, and the call of the red wattled lapwing occur repeatedly throughout the film. The duo keep trying to catch the bird in the entire film for an unknown reason which is later explained in the film. According to a local legend, it is believed that when the ash obtained by burning the black sparrow is sprinkled on someone, it hypnotizes them to fall in love with the person sprinkling it.

Jabya also befriends a bicycle mechanic named Chankya (Nagraj Manjule) who sees his young self in the boy. Chankya had once married a girl but she was soon forcefully taken away by her brother and left him beaten very badly. Since then he has renounced family life and taken up refuge in spirituality, mysticism and liquor. Jabya seeks support from Chankya in his quest to obtain his love, which Chankya readily extends. Perhaps the idea of sprinkling the ash of black sparrow on Shalu is suggested to Jabya by Chankya himself. The idea, however, is executed only in Jabya's dream.

Back in the village, Jabya's family members comply as they are exploited and dehumanized by the villagers over and over again. In the film's climax, Jabya finally acknowledges the existence of the kingdom and the boundaries of its residents (castes). He realises that he himself is the odd one out who is trying to assimilate in a world that prefers to stay within their own boundaries (a form of security).

He understands that his own boundaries have collapsed in his attempts to assimilate with the other castes and has thus become vulnerable to their attacks. Reaching self-awareness for the first time in his life, he suddenly explodes in rage and grabs a rock and throws it at his oppressors, thus re-establishing his boundary. His personal quest to assimilate with the others now broken by himself.

Cast
 Somnath Awghade as Jambuwant Kachru Mane (Jabya)
 Suraj Pawar as Piraji (Pirya)
 Chhaya Kadam as Nani
 Kishor Kadam as Kachru Mane (Nana)
 Rajeshwari Kharat as Shalu
 Bhushan Manjule as Dada Patil
 Nagraj Manjule as Chankya (Chankeshwar Sathe)
 Sohail Shaikh as Sangram
 Sanjay Chaudhri as Teacher
 Vikas Pandurang Patil as Navhi
 Prashant Kamble
 Jyoti Subhash
 Suhas Sirsat
 Moinuddin Inamdar as the Principal
 Pooja Dolas as Vedant's mother
 Shruti Awate as Rani
 Sakshi Vyavhare as Dhurpa
 Pravin Tarde as Sarpanch
 Suresh Vishwakarma as Patil

Crew
Story, screenplay, dialogues & direction – Nagraj Manjule
Producers – Nilesh Navlakha and Vivek Kajaria
Executive producer – Vivek Wagh
Costume designers – Gargee Kulkarni and Priyanka Dubey
Art director – Santosh Sankhad
Sound design – Nimish Chheda
Chief assistant director – Gargee Kulkarni and Kutub Inamdar
Assistant editor – Kutub Inamdar
On location sound – Christopher Robleto Harvey

Production and release
The film was praised at the Mumbai International Film Festival and was subsequently picked up by Zee Entertainment for distribution rights in Maharashtra in 125 to 150 screens. Vivek Kajaria, who produced the film along with Nilesh Navalakha, said "Fandry is one of the most awaited films of recent times and we have decided to go very strong on our marketing. Our partnership with Zee Entertainment has helped us a lot. We are trying our best to give it a wide release and hoping that the word-of-mouth will help us grow. Then it’s up to the audiences really."

The film released all over Maharashtra on 14 February 2014 and it was released in Gujarat, Madhya Pradesh and Goa along with 12 states on 28 February 2014.

Soundtrack
The soundtrack album of Fandry received positive reviews among the fans.

Awards and festivals
Official Selections:

Notes

References

External links
 
 Fandry Review

2013 films
Films about the caste system in India
Films scored by Alokananda Dasgupta
Films set in Maharashtra
Films scored by Ajay–Atul
Best Debut Feature Film of a Director National Film Award winners
Indian avant-garde and experimental films
2010s avant-garde and experimental films
2013 directorial debut films
2010s Marathi-language films